IntelliMax  is the name of several different brands or enterprises:

 An automation system by American firm SenSys.
 IntelliMax Solutions, an Australian provider of Business intelligence software 
 A brand of load management switches made by Fairchild Semiconductor
 Elekta IntelliMax, a platform for the delivery of remote services for the support of treatment delivery suites, by Swedish firm Elekta
 Online marketing software IntelliMaxx by Canadian firm dthree.

References